Bayraktutan is a village in the District of Iğdır, Iğdır Province, in eastern Turkey. In 2019 it had a population of 768.

Geography
The village lies to the east of Tuzluca,  by road west of the district capital of Iğdır.

References

Villages in Iğdır Province

Iğdır Central District
Populated places in Iğdır Province
Towns in Turkey